Mohammad Nouri (born 9 January 1983) is an Iranian football midfielder who currently plays  for Paykan.

Club career

Early career
He started his professional career with Homa in 2000. He played five years for the club before moving to Sepahan in the summer of 2005. He moved to Saba in summer 2007 and stayed for three seasons.

Persepolis

He moved to Persepolis in the summer of 2010 and was used as attacking midfielder. He was top scorer of Persepolis in 2010–11 season. He extended his contract with Persepolis for another three years on 12 May 2012, keeping him in the team till 2015. Before the start of 2013–14 season, he was named as the club's captain after the departure of Ali Karimi and retirement of Mehdi Mahdavikia.

Mesaimeer
Nouri joined newly promoted Qatari club Mesaimeer in July 2015 on a one-year contract.

Pars Jonoubi 
On 13 January 2018, Nouri officially joined Pars Jonoubi Jam.

Club career statistics

International career
Mohammad Nouri was a member of Iran national under-23 football team, participating in the 2006 Asian Games.

He made his debut for the senior national team in a friendly match against Ghana in June 2008. He was previously called up to join the national team in June 2007 for the 2007 Asian Cup, but did not make an appearance.

International goals
Scores and results list Iran's goal tally first.

Honours
Sepahan
Hazfi Cup: 2005–06, 2006–07

Hazfi Cup: 2010–11, 2012–13
Iran U23
Asian Games Bronze Medal: 2006

References

External links

 Mohammad Nouri at PersianLeague.com
 Mohammad Nouri at TeamMelli.com
 Mohammad Nouri's Profile in 18ghadam.ir
 

1983 births
Living people
Iranian footballers
Iran international footballers
Sepahan S.C. footballers
Saba players
Association football midfielders
Persepolis F.C. players
Homa F.C. players
Pars Jonoubi Jam players
Mesaimeer SC players
Persian Gulf Pro League players
Qatar Stars League players
2011 AFC Asian Cup players
Asian Games bronze medalists for Iran
People from Sonqor
Iranian expatriate footballers
Expatriate footballers in Qatar
Asian Games medalists in football
Footballers at the 2006 Asian Games
Gostaresh Foulad F.C. players
Medalists at the 2006 Asian Games